The 2018–19 Irish Cup (known as the Tennent's Irish Cup for sponsorship purposes) was the 139th edition of the premier knock-out cup competition in Northern Irish football. The competition began on 11 August 2018 and concluded with the final at Windsor Park on 4 May 2019.

Coleraine were the defending champions, having defeated Cliftonville in the 2018 final. Crusaders were the eventual winners, defeating second-tier side Ballinamallard United 3–0 in the final to lift the Cup for the fourth time overall, and the first time in the 10 years since winning the 2009 final.

Format and schedule
All ties level after 90 minutes used extra time to determine the winner, with a penalty shoot-out to follow if necessary.

126 clubs entered this season's competition – a reduction of four clubs compared with the 2017–18 total of 130 clubs. 90 regional league clubs from tiers 4–7 in the Northern Ireland football league system entered the competition in the first round, with 76 of them drawn into 38 first round fixtures and the remaining 14 clubs receiving a bye into the second round. The 38 first-round winners were joined by the 14 byes and the 12 clubs of the NIFL Premier Intermediate League in the second round. After two further rounds, the eight surviving clubs joined the 24 senior NIFL Premiership and NIFL Championship clubs in the fifth round. All ties level after 90 minutes used extra time to determine the winner, with a penalty shoot-out to follow if necessary.

Results

First round
Ties played on 11 and 18 August 2018.

Valley Rangers 3–2 Tandragee Rovers
Albert Foundry 4–3 Aquinas
Ardstraw 7–0 Dromore Amateurs
Ballymacash Rangers 1–3 Kilmore Recreation
Ballynahinch United 3–2 Groomsport
Banbridge Rangers 2–0 Sirocco Works
Bangor Amateurs 3–2 Newcastle
Brantwood 4–2 Orangefield Old Boys
Broomhedge Maghaberry 1–12 Ballynahinch Olympic
Comber Recreation 1–0 Immaculata
Cookstown Youth 1–6 Islandmagee
Crumlin United 2–1 Bangor Swifts
Desertmartin 2–2 Ballynure Old Boys (Desertmartin won 7–6 on pens)
Dungiven Celtic 5–2 Iveagh United
Dunloy 2–0 Hanover
Dunmurry Young Men 4–5 Rathfriland Rangers
Fivemiletown United 7–0 Bloomfield
Glebe Rangers 1–2 Bangor
Grove United 5–2 Chimney Corner

Holywood 1–2 Newbuildings United
Killyleagh YC 5–3 Markethill Swifts
Lisburn Rangers 2–1 Dromara Village
Lower Maze 2–3 Trojans
Malachians 2–9 Maiden City
Mossley 3–4 Dunmurry Rec.
Newtowne 6–3 18th Newtownabbey Old Boys
Oxford Sunnyside 6–3 Bryansburn Rangers
Oxford United Stars 0–1 Wakehurst
Rosario YC 1–2 Ballymoney United
Saintfield United 1–3 Laurelvale
Seapatrick 1–6 Coagh United
Silverwood 1–8 Shorts
St James' Swifts 2–1 Sofia Farmer
St Luke's 0–2 Larne Tech Old Boys
Strabane Athletic 2–1 Derriaghy Cricket Club
Suffolk 1–1 Colin Valley (Colin Valley won 4–3 on pens)
Tullycarnet 4–3 Tullyvallen
Woodvale 2–3 St Patrick's Young Men

Second round
The twelve members of the NIFL Premier Intermediate League joined the competition at this stage as well as the first-round winners and byes.

Ties played on Saturday 29 September 2018.

Newington 3–1 Valley Rangers (played on Friday 28 September)
Ballymoney United 1–5 Strabane Athletic
Banbridge Town 3–1 Rathfriland Rangers
Bangor 2–0 Banbridge Rangers
Bangor Amateurs 0–1 Tullycarnet
Brantwood 2–1 Laurelvale
Colin Valley 3–4 Shorts
Comber Rec 4–1 Lisburn Rangers
Crewe United 2–1 Moyola Park
Crumlin United 5–1 Moneyslane
Downshire Young Men 0–4 Drumaness Mills
Dundonald 0–3 Larne Tech Old Boys
Dunloy 2–0 Armagh City
Dunmurry Rec. 1–4 Dungiven Celtic
Grove United 3–4 Abbey Villa (aet)
Islandmagee 2–1 Albert Foundry

Killyleagh YC 2–3 Crumlin Star
Kilmore Recreation 1–2 Sport & Leisure Swifts
Lisburn Distillery 2–0 Wellington Recreation
Lurgan Celtic v St Patrick's Young Men (Lurgan Celtic received bye)
Lurgan Town 4–1 Desertmartin
Maiden City 3–1 Trojans
Newbuildings United 2–0 Ards Rangers
Newtowne 0–0 Ballynahinch Olympic (Newtowne won 5–3 on pens)
Oxford Sunnyside v Portstewart (Portstewart received bye)
Queen's University 4–3 Dollingstown
Rosemount Recreation 2–1 Annagh United
Seagoe 4–3 Ballynahinch United
Shankill United 2–1 1st Bangor Old Boys
St. James' Swifts 4–2 Coagh United
Tobermore United 5–3 Ardstraw
Wakehurst 2–3 Fivemiletown United

Third round

Ties were played Saturday 3 November 2018.

Crewe United 1–0 Sport & Leisure Swifts
Crumlin Star 5–3 Bangor
Crumlin United 1–3 Islandmagee
Drumaness Mills 1–2 Comber Recreation
Fivemiletown United 1–2 Tullycarnet
Larne Tech Old Boys 2–1 Dungiven Celtic
Lurgan Celtic 2–3 Portstewart
Lurgan Town 1–2 Dunloy
Newtowne 1–1 Rosemount Recreation (Rosemount Recreation won 5–3 on penalties)
Queen's University 6–3 Tobermore United
Seagoe 1–4 Maiden City
Shankill United 2–4 Lisburn Distillery
Shorts 1–3 Abbey Villa
St James' Swifts 2–0 Newbuildings United
Strabane Athletic 2–0 Banbridge Town
Brantwood 2–3 Newington

Fourth round

Ties were played on Saturday 1 December 2018.

Crewe United 1–2 Crumlin Star
Dunloy 0–2 Larne Tech Old Boys
Lisburn Distillery 4–3 Comber Recreation
Maiden City 1–0 Portstewart
Queen's University 4–1 Newington
Rosemount Recreation 3–1 Islandmagee
Strabane Athletic 2–0 St James' Swifts
Tullycarnet 3–4 Abbey Villa

Fifth round
Ties were played on Saturday 5 January 2019.

|}

Sixth round
Four ties were played on 2 February 2019, with four ties postponed to 11 February.

|}

Quarter-finals
Ties were played on 1 and 2 March 2019.

|}

Semi-finals
Ties were played on 30 March 2019.

|}

Final
The final was played on 4 May 2019.

References

External links
 Irish FA Domestic Cup Competitions – Irish Cup
 nifootball.co.uk

2018–19
Cup
2018–19 European domestic association football cups